Lumiao railway station  is a railway station on the Shangqiu–Hangzhou high-speed railway in Qiaocheng District, Bozhou, Anhui, China. Opened on 1 December 2019, this is a rural station that serves several surrounding villages.

References

Railway stations in Anhui
Railway stations in China opened in 2019